Olivetti S.p.A. is an Italian manufacturer of computers, tablets, smartphones, printers and other such business products as calculators and fax machines. Headquartered in Ivrea, in the Metropolitan City of Turin, the company has been part of the TIM Group since 2003. One of the first commercial programmable desktop calculators, the Programma 101, was produced by Olivetti in 1964 and was a commercial success.

History

Founding 

The company was founded as a typewriter manufacturer by Camillo Olivetti in 1908 in the Turin commune of Ivrea, Italy. The firm was mainly developed by his son Adriano Olivetti, whose utopian vision led not only the company's worldwide expansion and commercial sucess, but also influenced business practice, politics, and culture.

Olivetti opened its first overseas manufacturing plant in 1930, and its Divisumma electric calculator was launched in 1948. Olivetti produced Italy's first electronic computer, the transistorised Elea 9003, in 1959, and purchased the Underwood Typewriter Company that year. In 1964 the company sold its electronics division to the American company General Electric. In order to qualify for new loans, bankers made it a condition that the company's electronic division be sold to General Electric. It continued to develop new computing products on its own; one of these was Programma 101, one of the first commercially produced programmable calculators. In the 1970s and 1980s they were the biggest manufacturer for office machines in Europe and 2nd biggest PC vendor behind IBM in Europe.

In 1980, Olivetti began distributing in Indonesia through Dragon Computer & Communication.

In 1981, Olivetti installed the electronic voting systems for the European Parliament in Strasburg and Luxembourg.

In September 1994, the company launched Olivetti Telemedia chaired by Elserino Piol.

Since 2003, Olivetti has been part of the TIM Group through a merger.

Design 

Olivetti became famous for the meticulous attention it paid to the design of its products, through collaborations with notable architects and designers, over a nearly 60-year period starting in the late 1930s. An early example is the portable 1932 Olivetti MP1 (Modello Portatile in Italian).

From the 1940s to the 1960s, Olivetti industrial design was led by Marcello Nizzoli, who was responsible for the Lexicon 80 and the portable Lettera 22 typewriters, which were released in 1948 and 1950 respectively. The architect and designer Ettore Sottsass began consulting for Olivetti in the late 1950s and designed a series of products including the Tekne 3 typewriter in 1958, the Elea 9003 computer in 1959, and later, the Praxis 48 typewriter in 1964 and the Valentine portable typewriter in 1969. 

In 1954, Mario Tchou joined Olivetti and was in put in charge of a team responsible for creating a commercial computer. In 1957, the team created the Elea 9001. Tchou went on to lead a team of 500 engineers, and decided to include transistors in the Elea 9003.

Mario Bellini joined Sottsass at Olivetti in 1963. He designed the Programma 101 (1965),  the Divisumma 18 (1973), and the Logos 68 (1973) calculators, and in 1966 the TCV-250 video display terminal. Mario Bellini and Ettore Sottsass, who by then directed design for Olivetti, hired designers such as George Sowden and James Irvine. Sowden worked for Olivetti from 1970 until 1990 and designed the company's first desktop computer, the Olivetti L1, in 1978 (following ergonomic research lasting two years). In 1991, Sowden's design for the Olivetti fax OFX420 won the ADI Compasso d'Oro Award. In 1999 Michele De Lucchi designed the Art Jet 10 inkjet printer, which was also awarded the Compasso d'Oro, and in 2001, the Gioconda calculator.  

In 1952, the Museum of Modern Art in New York (MoMA) held an exhibit titled "Olivetti: Design in Industry" Another exhibit was mounted by the Musée des Arts Décoratifs in Paris in 1969 and later toured five other cities. Many Olivetti products and archival material related to design are held in museum collections including the MoMA design collection, the Cooper Hewitt in New York, and the Centre Pompidou in Paris. Between 1954 and 2001, Olivetti won 16 Compasso d'Oro awards for design. In May 2022, ADI Design Museum in Milan paid tribute to this achievement with an exhibition titled Podium 16.

Olivetti paid attention to more than product design. Graphic design and architectural design was also considered pivotal to the company, which engaged architects and designers such as Gae Aulenti, BBPR, Egon Eiermann, Ignazio Gardella, Louis Kahn, Le Corbusier, Carlo Scarpa, Giovanni Pintori, Bob Noorda, and Lella and Massimo Vignelli to design factories, office buildings, showrooms, and publicity materials.

Giovanni Pintori was hired by Adriano Olivetti in 1936 to work in the publicity department. Pintori was the creator of the Olivetti logo and many promotional posters used to advertise the company and its products. During his activity as Art Director from 1950, Olivetti's graphic design obtained several international awards, and he designed works that created the Olivetti image and became emblematic Italian reference in the history of 20th-century design.

Those designers also created the Olivetti Synthesis office furniture series which mainly were used to be installed in the firm's own headquarters, worldwide branch offices and showrooms. Olivetti also produced some industrial production machinery, including metalworking machines of the Horizon series.

Typewriters 

Olivetti began with mechanical typewriters when the company was founded in 1909, and produced them until the mid-1990s. Until the mid-1960s, they were fully mechanical, and models such as the portable Olivetti Valentine were designed by Ettore Sottsass.

With the Tekne/Editor series and Praxis 48, some of the first electromechanical typewriters were introduced. The Editor series was used for speed typing championship competition. The Editor 5 from 1969 was the top model of that series, with proportional spacing and the ability to support justified text borders. In 1972 the electromechanical typeball machines of the Lexicon 90 to 94C series were introduced, as competitors to the IBM Selectric typewriters, the top model 94c supported proportional spacing and justified text borders like the Editor 5, as well as lift-off correction.

In 1978 Olivetti was one of the first manufacturers to introduce electronic daisywheel printer-based word processing machines, called TES 401 and TES 501. Later the ET series typewriters without (or with) LCD and different levels of text editing capabilities were popular in offices. Models in that line were ET 121, ET 201, ET 221, ET 225, ET 231, ET 351, ET 109, ET 110, ET 111, ET 112, ET 115, ET 116, ET 2000, ET 2100, ET 2200, ET 2250, ET 2300, Et 2400 and ET 2500. For home users in 1982 the Praxis 35, Praxis 40 and 45D were some of the first portable electronic typewriters. Later, Olivetti added the Praxis 20, ET Compact 50, ET Compact 60, ET Compact 70, ET Compact 65/66, the ET Personal series and Linea 101. The top models were 8 lines LCD based portables like Top 100 and Studio 801, with the possibility to save the text to a 3.5-inch floppy disk.

The professional line was upgraded with the ETV series video typewriters based on CP/M operating system, ETV 240, ETV 250, ETV 300, ETV 350 and later MS-DOS operating system based ETV 260, ETV 500, ETV 2700, ETV 2900, ETV 4000s word processing systems having floppy drives or hard disks. Some of them (ETV 300, 350, 500, 2900) were external boxes that could be connected through an optional serial interface to many of the ET series office typewriters, the others were fully integrated with an external monitor which could be installed on a holder over the desk. Most of the ET/ETV/Praxis series electronic typewriters were designed by Marion Bellini.

By 1994, Olivetti stopped production of typewriters, as most users had transitioned to personal computers.

Computers 

Between 1955 and 1964 Olivetti developed some of the first transistorized mainframe computer systems, such as the Elea 9003. Although 40 large commercial 9003 and over 100 smaller 6001 scientific machines were completed and leased to customers to 1964, low sales, loss of two key managers and financial instability caused Olivetti to withdraw from the field in 1964.

In 1965 Olivetti released the Programma 101, considered one of the first commercial desktop programmable calculators. It was saved from the sale of the computer division to GE thanks to an employee, Gastone Garziera, who spent successive nights changing the internal categorization of the product from "computer" to "calculator", so leaving the small team in Olivetti and creating some awkward situations in the office, since that space was now owned by GE. 
In 1974 the firm released the TC800, an intelligent terminal designed to be attached to a mainframe and used in the finance sector. It was followed in 1977 by the TC1800.

During the 1970s Olivetti also manufactured and sold two ranges of minicomputers. The 'A' series started with the typewriter-sized A4 through to the large A8, and the desk-sized DE500 and DE700 series.

Olivetti's first modern personal computer, the M20, featuring a Zilog Z8000 CPU, was released in 1982.
The M20 was followed in 1983 by the M24, a clone of the IBM PC using DOS and the Intel 8086 processor (at 8 MHz) instead of the Intel 8088 used by IBM (at 4.77 MHz). The M24 was sold in North America as the AT&T 6300. Olivetti also manufactured the AT&T 6300 Plus, which could run both DOS and Unix. The M24 in the US also was sold as Xerox 6060. The Olivetti M28 was the firm's first PC to have the Intel 80286 processor.
The same year Olivetti produced its M10 laptop computer, a 8085-based workalike of the successful Radio Shack TRS-80 Model 100, which it marketed in Europe. These were the first laptops to sell in million-unit quantities, though the  itself only attained sales figures in the tens of thousands and went out of production within two years.

During the 1980s and 1990s Olivetti continued to release PC compatible machines, facing mounting competition from other brands. It turned to laptops, introducing in 1991 the D33, a laptop in a carry case, and continuing with the M111, M211, S20, D33, Philos and Echos series. A very interesting subnotebook was the Quaderno, about the same size as an A5 paper – it was the grandfather of the netbooks introduced 20 years later.

Olivetti did attempt to recover its position by introducing the Envision in 1995, a full multimedia PC, to be used in the living room; this project was a failure. Packard Bell managed to successfully introduce a similar product in the U.S. but only some years later.

The company continued to develop personal computers until it sold its PC business in 1997.

End of Olivetti as a separate company 
In the 1990s, Olivetti's computer businesses were in great difficulty, reportedly because of the competition from US vendors and new cheap manufacturers for PC components in Taiwan like ASUS, MSI, Gigabyte and so on from which local system builders profited much to offer cheaper PCs than Olivetti did with their own designs. It was on the brink of collapse and had needed government support to stay afloat.

Digital were already reselling Olivetti personal computer models in Europe, and the investment presented an opportunity for the adoption of Digital's Alpha processor in Olivetti's workstation products. The investment programme was to be conducted in two steps over an 18 month period, augmented by additional share purchases. The partnership between the companies, regarded as a way of supporting Olivetti whilst cementing a development relationship around Digital's Alpha platform, developed in the following two years, although the balance of revenue from selling products to each other was reported as being strongly in Olivetti's favour, it having generated  lire from Digital in 1993, but with Digital only selling products worth  lire to Olivetti. Digital remained a significant purchaser of laser printers and laptops from Olivetti, but had begun to manufacture its own personal computers and planned to produce its own laptop products. Meanwhile, Olivetti had been slow to introduce Alpha-based products, eventually shipping models based on Digital's own products.

A company in transition, it had moved out of the typewriter business into personal computers before embracing telecoms between 1997 and 1999, spinning off its personal computer business in 1997 and divesting its computer services business in 1998. In the process it had lost around three-quarters of its staff.

In 1999, The Luxembourg-based company Bell S.A. acquired a controlling stake in Olivetti, but sold it to a consortium including the Pirelli and Benetton groups two years later. Olivetti then launched a hostile bid for Telecom Italia in February 1999, despite being less than a seventh of the size of its target. In a take-over battle against Deutsche Telekom and other potential bidders that initially seem to have been settled in Deutsche Telecom's favour, with an  merger reportedly agreed in April 1999, Olivetti won out and controlled 52.12% of former monopoly Telecom Italia, Italy's #1 fixed-line and mobile phone operator. However, the ownership structure of the merged Olivetti / Telecom Italia was complex and multi-layered with Olivetti took on around $16 billion of extra debt. It was then referred to as the "Olivetti/Telecom Italia affair" because of the unpleasant secret affairs behind.

After a 2003 reorganization, Olivetti became the office equipment and systems services subsidiary of Telecom Italia. In 2003 Olivetti was absorbed into the Telecom Italia group, maintaining a separate identity as Olivetti Tecnost.

Rebirth and resumption of computer production
In 2005, Telecom Italia relaunched the company in the information technology sector, investing €200 million; at first, restoring the original Olivetti brand, then replacing it with Olivetti Tecnost in 2003. In 2007, Olivetti launched the "LINEA_OFFICE", designed by Jasper Morrison for Olivetti; a new line of PCs, notebooks, printers, fax machines and calculators. Olivetti today operates in Italy and Switzerland, and has sales associates in 83 countries. Research and development are located in Agliè, Carsoli and Scarmagno in Italy, and Yverdon, Switzerland.

In March 2011 Olivetti began producing the OliPad, its first tablet computer, featuring a ten-inch screen, 3G, WiFi, Bluetooth connectivity, Nvidia Tegra 2, Android 2.2.2 and a 1024 x 600 display. It also features an application store, with apps specifically designed by Olivetti for 'business & government'. In 2014 the R&D department in Arnad was sold to SICPA.

Smartphones
In 2013, Olivetti launched a series of smartphones called Oliphone:
 Olivetti Oliphone M8140
 Olivetti Oliphone Q8145
 Olivetti Oliphone Q8150
 Olivetti Oliphone Q9047
 Olivetti Oliphone WG451
 Olivetti Oliphone WG501

See also

 List of Italian companies
 Olivetti typewriters
 Olivetti computers
 TIM Group

References

External links

 
 
 
 
 
 
 

Technology companies established in 1908
Electronics companies established in 1908
Italian companies established in 1908
 
Italian brands
Mobile phone manufacturers
Mechanical calculator companies
Electromechanical calculator companies
Computer printer companies
Office supply companies
Computer companies of Italy
Computer hardware companies
Electronics companies of Italy
Home computer hardware companies
Netbook manufacturers
Display technology companies
Telecommunications equipment vendors
Mobile phone companies of Italy
Multinational companies headquartered in Italy
Telecom Italia
2003 mergers and acquisitions
Ivrea
Industrial design
Compasso d'Oro Award recipients